Cartoon Network Too (stylised CN Too) was a British television channel that was owned by Turner Broadcasting. CN Too was the sister station of Cartoon Network, and it often aired programmes a while after they are shown on the main Cartoon Network. Cartoon Network Too was shut down on 1 April 2014.

History

2006–2007: Launch and early years

On 24 April 2006, which was coincidentally the day Nick Jr. Too was also launched, Cartoon Network Too was launched on Sky. It also became available on SCTV Digital when that service became available in 2006, along with Cartoon Network and Boomerang. Cartoon Network Too aired from 3am to 7pm, sharing a broadcast frequency with TCM 2, from TCM.

During its early months, Cartoon Network Too mainly broadcast older shows from Cartoon Network's library, such as Dexter's Laboratory, The Powerpuff Girls, Johnny Bravo, Wacky Races, and Cow and Chicken. alongside then-currently-running shows like Ed, Edd n Eddy, The Cramp Twins, and Courage the Cowardly Dog.

After this period, the channel transitioned to a "Modern-Classics" format, airing many currently-running Cartoon Network shows alongside programmes airing on Boomerang, and occasional older programming.

Introduction of Cartoonito block
Starting from September 2006, Cartoon Network Too gave up 9 of its 16 hours of programming a day for Cartoonito as a programming block from 6am until 3pm. Cartoon Network Too's airtime remained 3am to 7pm, however the actual programming from Cartoon Network Too only aired between 3 and 6am then from 3 until 7pm, as the remaining hours contained Cartoonito's programming.

2007–2014: Cartoon Network Too as a 24 hour channel
On 2 May 2007, Turner announced that Cartoon Network Too would be expanded to a full 24-hour slot beginning on 24 May and merge with Toonami, taking its slot. This would allow the channel to begin broadcasting on Virgin Media in addition to Sky, as well as to allow a standalone Cartoonito channel to launch in the channel's original slot on Sky. To prepare for the merger, viewers were given three weeks of notice.

On May 24, at 7pm, the old version of Cartoon Network Too closed for the last time. Then, on the same day at 3am, Toonami shut down permanently and Cartoon Network Too was moved into its slot, while the standalone Cartoonito channel launched in Cartoon Network Too's original time-shared-with-TCM2 slot.

In June 2007, Cartoon Network Too became available on Top Up TV Anytime, which is a video-on-demand service. However, in June 2009, it was removed, but Cartoon Network continues to be accessible via Top Up TV Anytime. In June 2010, Cartoon Network Too was removed from SCTV Digital as a result of that service going into administration.

Relaunch as an action-focused channel (2012-2014)
In May 2012, Cartoon Network Too's logo was changed in line with the already updated main logo of Cartoon Network, and transitioned it's programming to a more male-focused audience, with a heavier focus on action-adventure programming such as Ben 10: Alien Force and Star Wars: The Clone Wars. During overnight hours, usually between midnight and 6am, it also aired some shows which are no longer being produced, and are no longer in high demand (i.e. Skatoony).

On 1 April 2014, Cartoon Network Too was shut down, the final programme on Cartoon Network Too was an episode of Skatoony, followed by promos of what was airing on Cartoon Network, then a bumper following into a clip of Cartoon Network's promotional content from 2007, which was shown incomplete as Cartoon Network +1 was relaunched into Cartoon Network Too's channel space.

Former programming
 Adventure Time
 Bakugan: Mechtanium Surge
 The Batman
 Batman: The Brave and the Bold
 Ben 10
 Ben 10: Alien Force
 Ben 10: Ultimate Alien
 Best Ed
 Casper's Scare School
 Chop Socky Chooks
 Codename: Kids Next Door
 The Cramp Twins
 Chowder
 Courage the Cowardly Dog
 Cow and Chicken
 Da Boom Crew
 Dastardly and Muttley in Their Flying Machines
 Dexter's Laboratory
 Duck Dodgers
 Ed, Edd n Eddy
 Fantastic Four: World's Greatest Heroes
 The Flintstones
 Foster's Home for Imaginary Friends
 The Garfield Show
 Generator Rex
 The Grim Adventures of Billy & Mandy
 Hero: 108
 Hong Kong Phooey
 Johnny Bravo
 Johnny Test
 Legion of Super-Heroes
 Loonatics Unleashed
 Looney Tunes
 The Looney Tunes Show
 The Marvelous Misadventures of Flapjack
 Pink Panther and Pals
 Pokémon
 The Powerpuff Girls
 Regular Show
 Redakai: Conquer the Kairu
 Robotboy
 Scooby-Doo, Where Are You!
 The Scooby-Doo Show
 The Secret Saturdays
 Shaggy & Scooby-Doo Get a Clue! (Now on CITV)
 Skatoony
 Star Wars: The Clone Wars
 Storm Hawks
 The Sylvester & Tweety Mysteries
 Thundercats
 Tom and Jerry
 Tom and Jerry Tales
 Top Cat
 Transformers: Prime
 Wacky Races
 What's New, Scooby-Doo? (Now on Boomerang)
 World of Quest
 X-Men: Evolution
 Xiaolin Showdown
 The Yogi Bear Show

Cartoonito programming block
 Animal Stories
 Baby Looney Tunes
 Barney & Friends
 Bigfoot Presents: Meteor and the Mighty Monster Trucks
 Blanche
 Caillou
 Cartoonito Karaoke
 Ellen's Acres
 Firehouse Tales
 Fluffy Gardens
 Hi-5 UK
 Little People Miss BG Pororo the Little Penguin Roobarb and Custard Too''

References

External links
 

Children's television networks
Children's television channels in the United Kingdom
Defunct television channels in the United Kingdom
Television channels in the United Kingdom
Turner Broadcasting System Europe
Cartoon Network
British companies established in 2006
Television channels and stations established in 2006
Television channels and stations disestablished in 2014
Warner Bros. Discovery EMEA